Pilarz is Polish-language surname literally meaning sawyer (occupation). Notable people with this surname include:

Grzegorz Pilarz (born 1980), Polish volleyball player 
Józef Pilarz (1956–2008), Polish politician 
Krzysztof Pilarz (born 1980), Polish footballer goalkeeper 
Scott Pilarz (1959–2021), American Jesuit priest, President of Marquette University, former President of the University of Scranton

See also
Pilar (surname)

Polish-language surnames
Occupational surnames